Dystasia circulata is a species of beetle in the family Cerambycidae. It was described by Francis Polkinghorne Pascoe in 1864. It is known from Borneo and Malaysia.

References

Pteropliini
Beetles described in 1864